Olamilekan Adegbite is the Nigerian minister of Mines and Steel Development. Adegbite was formerly the Commissioner for Works and Infrastructure in Ogun State under the Ibikunle Amosun regime.

References

Living people
Year of birth missing (living people)
Government ministers of Nigeria